Stepping Sisters is a 1932 American pre-Code comedy film directed by Seymour Felix and starring Louise Dresser, Minna Gombell and Jobyna Howland.

Premise
A trio of former burlesque dancers now living in high society try to prevent their past occupation from being discovered.

Main cast
 Louise Dresser as Mrs. Cissie Ramsey née Black  
 Minna Gombell as Rosie La Marr  
 Jobyna Howland as Lady Chetworth-Lynde aka Queenie  
 William Collier Sr. as Herbert Ramsey  
 Stanley Smith as Jack Carleton  
 Barbara Weeks as Norma Ramsey  
 Howard Phillips as Warren Tremaine  
 Ferdinand Munier as Ambassador Leonard 
 Mary Forbes as Mrs. Tremaine  
 Robert Greig as Jepson  
 Pietro Sosso as Butler  
 Franklin Pangborn as Gason  
 Arthur Housman as Max  
 Max Wagner as Joey

References

Bibliography
 Solomon, Aubrey. The Fox Film Corporation, 1915-1935. A History and Filmography. McFarland & Co, 2011.

External links
 

1932 films
1932 comedy films
American comedy films
American black-and-white films
20th Century Fox films
1930s English-language films
1930s American films